The men's 50m freestyle S10 event at the 2008 Summer Paralympics took place at the Beijing National Aquatics Center on 14 September. There were two heats; the swimmers with the eight fastest times advanced to the final.

Results

Heats
Competed from 10:50.

Heat 1

Heat 2

Final
Competed at 20:25.

 
Q = qualified for final. WR = World Record.

References
 
 

Swimming at the 2008 Summer Paralympics